Florian Mayer was the defending champion, but he did not participate this year.

Alexander Zverev won the tournament, defeating Paul-Henri Mathieu in the final, 1–6, 6–1, 6–4.

Seeds

  Andrey Golubev (semifinals)
  Pablo Carreño Busta (first round)
  Tobias Kamke (first round)
  Paul-Henri Mathieu (final)
  Diego Sebastian Schwartzman (quarterfinals)
  Thomaz Bellucci (second round)
  Peter Gojowczyk (first round)
  Julian Reister (first round)

Draw

Finals

Top half

Bottom half

References
 Main Draw
 Qualifying Draw

Sparkassen Open – Singles
2014 Singles